A complete list of known films about a rock band Zabranjeno Pušenje and a list of released music videos by the band.

Filmography

Music videos

See also 
 Zabranjeno pušenje discography
 List of songs recorded by Zabranjeno pušenje

References

External links 
 Music videos at zabranjeno-pusenje.com
 

Videography
Zabranjeno